Hydrogen is an open source drum machine created by Alessandro Cominu, an Italian programmer who goes by the pseudonym Comix. Its main goal is to provide professional yet simple and intuitive pattern-based drum programming.

Hydrogen was originally developed for Linux, and later ported to Mac OS X. Support for Microsoft Windows seemed to have been abandoned, since the last build dated to 2006 for 4 years. However, a Windows port exists since the 0.9.6 version, and it is now in beta stage. The graphical user interface for the application uses Qt library, and all code is released under GPL-2.0-or-later.

Features
These are some of the features of Hydrogen:

 Pattern-based sequencer, with unlimited number of patterns and ability to chain patterns into a song.
 192 ticks per whole note with individual level per event and variable pattern length. 
 Unlimited instrument tracks with volume, mute, solo, pan capabilities.
 Multi-layer support for instruments (up to 16 samples for each instrument).
 Sample Editor, with basic cut and loop functions.
 Time-stretch and pitch functions.
 Time-line with variable tempo.
 Single and stacked pattern mode.
 Ability to import/export song files.
 Support for LADSPA effects.
 Real-time slide control for swing.
 Option to slightly randomize velocity, time, pitch and swing functions to give a more "human" playback.
 Multiple patterns playing at once.
 Various Drumkits available to download (Rock, Jazz, Electric, Percussions...), plus support to create a custom drumkit.

See also 

 Free audio software
 Linux audio software

References

External links 

 
 
 
 

Software drum machines
Free audio editors
Free music software
Digital audio editors for Linux
Free software programmed in C++
Audio editing software that uses Qt